Pinerolo Palaghiaccio is a 2000-seat indoor arena located in Pinerolo, Italy. The venue hosted the curling competitions for the 2006 Winter Olympics in neighbouring Turin.

References
2006 Winter Olympics official report. Volume 3. pp. 68–9.

Venues of the 2006 Winter Olympics
Olympic curling venues
Indoor arenas in Italy
Sports venues in Italy
Curling venues in Italy
Buildings and structures in Pinerolo
Sports venues in Piedmont